Eugenia Crucesan (born 1889, Falesti, Basarabia; died 11 March 1976, Timișoara, Romania) was the first female lawyer in Bessarabia. She begins her lawyer career by signing up in the bar of lawyers in Chisinau. In the early 1950s, she moved to Timișoara. She practised law until retirement.

References

1889 births
1976 deaths
People from Fălești District
People from Beletsky Uyezd
Romanian women lawyers